Played is a Canadian action/drama television series which premiered on CTV on October 3, 2013. The series was developed and is produced by Greg Nelson (Rookie Blue), Adrienne Mitchell (Bomb Girls) and Janis Lundman (Durham County).
It follows a team of undercover police officers belonging to the fictional Covert Investigations Unit (CIU).  Each episode finds them risking their lives by going undercover on short term, high intensity assignments to infiltrate and bring down criminal organizations at a fast pace.  Often having to think on their feet, they find it easy to lose track of who they really are, but smooth talking and quick thinking when things go wrong usually get them out of trouble.
The series was cancelled after its first season.

Cast 

 Vincent Walsh as Detective John Moreland 
 Chandra West as Detective Sergeant Rebecca Ellis
 Lisa Marcos as Detective Constable Maria Cortez
 Dwain Murphy as Detective Constable Daniel Price
 Agam Darshi as Officer Khali Bhatt
 Adam Butcher as Officer Jesse Calvert

Episodes

References

External links 

CTV Television Network original programming
2013 Canadian television series debuts
2013 Canadian television series endings
2010s Canadian crime drama television series
English-language television shows
Canadian police procedural television series